The 2000–01 Gamma Ethniki was the 18th season since the official establishment of the third tier of Greek football in 1983. Patraikos was crowned champion, thus winning promotion to Beta Ethniki. Chalkidona-Near East also won promotion after a winning a promotion play-off in which was participated with Atromitos and Ethnikos Piraeus.

Acharnaikos, Naoussa, Kozani, Ampelokipi, Lamia, Veria, Anagennisi Karditsa, ILTEX Lykoi, Pierikos and Ialysos Rodos were relegated to Delta Ethniki.

League table

Promotion play-offs

|}

Relegation play-off

|}

Top scorers

References

Third level Greek football league seasons
3
Greece